AS Saint-Étienne won Division 1 season 1963/1964 of the French Association Football League with 44 points.

Participating teams 

 Angers SCO
 Bordeaux
 RC Lens
 Olympique Lyonnais
 AS Monaco
 FC Nantes
 OGC Nice
 Nîmes Olympique
 RC Paris
 Stade de Reims
 Stade Rennais UC
 FC Rouen
 AS Saint-Étienne
 UA Sedan-Torcy
 Stade Français FC
 RC Strasbourg
 Toulouse FC
 US Valenciennes-Anzin

Final table 

Promoted from Division 2, who will play in Division 1 season 1964/1965
 Lille OSC: Champion
 FC Sochaux-Montbéliard: runner-up
 SC Toulon: Fourth place (FC Metz (3rd) did not qualify)

Results

Top goalscorers

References
 Division 1 season 1963-1964 at pari-et-gagne.com

Ligue 1 seasons
French
1